Hunas or Huna (Middle Brahmi script:  Hūṇā) was the name given by the ancient Indians to a group of Central Asian tribes who, via the Khyber Pass, entered the Indian subcontinent at the end of the 5th or early 6th century. The Hunas occupied areas as far south as Eran and Kausambi, greatly weakening the Gupta Empire. The Hunas were ultimately defeated by a coalition of Indian princes that included an Indian king Yasodharman and the Gupta emperor, Narasimhagupta. They defeated a Huna army and their ruler Mihirakula in 528 CE and drove them out of India. The Guptas are thought to have played only a minor role in this campaign.

The Hunas are thought to have included the Xionite and/or Hephthalite, the Kidarites, the Alchon Huns (also known as the Alxon, Alakhana, Walxon etc.) and the Nezak Huns. Such names, along with that of the Harahunas (also known as the Halahunas or Harahuras) mentioned in Hindu texts, have sometimes been used for the Hunas in general; while these groups (and the Iranian Huns) appear to have been a component of the Hunas, such names were not necessarily synonymous. Some authors suggest that the Hunas were Ephthalite Huns from Central Asia. The relationship, if any, of the Hunas to the Huns, a Central Asian people who invaded Europe during the same period, is also unclear. 

In its farthest geographical extent in India, the territories controlled by the Hunas covered the region up to Malwa in central India. Their repeated invasions and war losses were the main reason for the decline of the Gupta Empire.

History

Chinese sources link the Central Asian tribes comprising the Hunas to both the Xiongnu of north east Asia and the Huns who later invaded and settled in Europe. Similarly, Gerald Larson suggests that the Hunas were a Turkic-Mongolian grouping from Central Asia. The works of Ptolemy (2nd century) are among the first European texts to mention the Huns, followed by the texts by Marcellinus and Priscus. They too suggest that the Huns were an inner Asian people.

The 6th-century Roman historian Procopius of Caesarea (Book I. ch. 3), related the Huns of Europe with the Hephthalites or "White Huns" who subjugated the Sassanids and invaded northwestern India, stating that they were of the same stock, "in fact as well as in name", although he contrasted the Huns with the Hephthalites, in that the Hephthalites were sedentary, white-skinned, and possessed "not ugly" features:

The Kidarites, who invaded Bactria in the second half of the 4th century, are generally regarded as the first wave of Hunas to enter Indian Subcontinent.

The Gupta empire under Skandagupta in the 5th century had successfully repulsed one Hun attack in the northwest in 460 CE. However, over the period of the next several years, the Hunas under successive kings were able to make inroads into the subcontinent. 

They were initially based in the Oxus basin in Central Asia and established their control over Gandhara in the northwestern part of the Indian subcontinent by about 465 CE. From there, they fanned out into various parts of northern, western, and central India. The Hūṇas are mentioned in several ancient texts such as the Rāmāyaṇa, Mahābhārata, Purāṇas, and Kalidasa’s Raghuvaṃśa.

In 528 CE, another campaign led by a coalition of Indian kings finally defeated king Mihirakula and his Huna army. The victory was inscribed on a stone pillar and erected in honor of (and in praise for) one of the leaders of the coalition, king Yashodharman, in Mandasaur in Central India. Huna kings in this inscription are described as 'rude and cruel'. They were also responsible for the destruction of Buddhist monasteries and centers of learning in the Northwest regions of the country. 

The Mongolian-Tibetan historian Sumpa Yeshe Peljor (writing in the 18th century) lists the Hunas alongside other peoples found in Central Asia since antiquity, including the Yavanas (Greeks), Kambojas, Tukharas, Khasas and  Daradas.

Gurjara-Pratiharas

The Gurjara-Pratiharas suddenly emerged as a political power in north India around sixth century CE, shortly after the Hunas invasion of that region. The Gujara-Pratihara were "likely" formed from a fusion of the Alchon Huns ("White Huns") and native Indian elements, and can probably be considered as a Hunnic state, although its precise origins remain unclear. In Bana's Harshacharita (7th century CE), the Gurjaras are associated with the Hunas. 

Some of the Hunas may also have contributed to the formation of the warlike Rajputs.

Religion
The religious beliefs of the Hunas is unknown, and believed to be a combination of ancestor worship, totemism and animism.

Song Yun and Hui Zheng, who visited the chief of the Hephthalite nomads at his summer residence in Badakshan and later in Gandhara, observed that they had no belief in the Buddhist law and served a large number of divinities."

Gallery

See also
 Kushan Empire
 36 royal races
 Ancient India and Central Asia
 Alchon Huns

Notes

References
 Iaroslav Lebedynsky, "Les Nomades", Paris 2007, 

Ancient peoples of India
Ancient peoples of Pakistan
Hephthalites
Historical Iranian peoples
Nomadic groups in Eurasia